ESC/P, short for Epson Standard Code for Printers and sometimes styled Escape/P, is a printer control language developed by Epson to control computer printers. It was mainly used in dot matrix printers and some inkjet printers, and is still widely used in many receipt thermal printers. During the era of dot matrix printers, it was also used by other manufacturers (e.g., NEC), sometimes in modified form. At the time, it was a popular mechanism to add formatting to printed text, and was widely supported in software.

Derivation
ESC/P derives its name from the start of the escape sequences used, which start with the escape character ESC (ASCII code 27). As an example, ESC E will switch to printing in bold font, while ESC F switches off bold printing. The ESC/P control codes are sometimes also referred to as Epson LQ codes, as they were made popular by the Epson LQ series of dot matrix printers, even though ESC/P was introduced long before LQ printers.

Variants
There are several variants of ESC/P, as not all printers implement all commands.
 ESC/P J84 adds special support for Japanese computers.
 ESC/P2 is a more recent variant of ESC/P by Epson. ESC/P2 is backward compatible with ESC/P, but adds commands for new printer features such as scalable fonts and enhanced graphics printing.
 ESC/P-R is a variant now used by Epson on many inkjet printers.
 ESC/POS is a variant for controlling receipt printers as commonly used at the point of sale (POS).
 ESC/P-K adds special support for Chinese computers.

Current printers
As of 2014, few modern/office/consumer non-Epson printers use ESC/P; instead most are driven through a standardized page description language, usually PCL or PostScript, or they use proprietary protocols such as Hardware Code Pages.

Note many current clone thermal receipt printers still continue to use the ESC/POS command set.

All current Epson impact printers still support ESC/P
, all current Epson receipt/thermal printers support ESC/POS and some Epson Stylus inkjets still seem to be using some variant of ESC/P. See the Gutenprint (Gimp Print) project for source code examples.

See also
 Hardware code page
 Printer driver
 CUPS Apple MacOS/Linux printing subsystem

References

External links 
 Epson ESC/P Reference Manual: Dec 1997, 2002 Addendum, June 2004
 Epson Developer Site
 List of Epson FX printer codes
 Gutenprint CVSweb view of printers.xml
 The Developer's Guide to Gutenprint, Chapter 5: ESC/P2
 Source of Epson P-R driver for Linux
 Epson ESC/P2 scalable fonts print sample (300dpi scan)

Page description languages
Epson